Andy Murray's 2016 tennis season began at the Australian Open. The 2016 season was Murray's greatest season, as he finished the season as the year-end world No. 1 player and clinched the year-end prize money title. Andy and Jamie Murray, also became the first brothers to finish as year-end No. 1 ranked players in singles and doubles team, respectively. He won an ATP-best and career-high nine Tour titles from 13 finals (from 17 tournaments), including his second Wimbledon crown and second successive Olympic gold medal in singles, thus becoming the first person, man or woman, to defend the Olympic singles title. In the 2016 season, Murray became the first male player to win singles titles at a Grand Slam, the Olympics, a Masters 1000 event, and the ATP Finals in the same calendar year (Serena Williams, in 2012, is the only other person to accomplish this feat). 

On 7 November, Murray became the first British man and 26th male player to attain the world No. 1-ranking in singles since records began in 1973, displacing long-time rival and friend, Novak Djokovic. At , Murray is the oldest first-time singles No. 1 in the last 40 years. He reached the No. 1 ranking despite the fact that, in contrast to previous years, no ranking points were awarded for the Olympics. Djokovic had a 3–2 edge in matches between the two in 2016, including winning their two matches in Grand Slam finals (Australian and French Opens). Murray had a 1–1 record against Rafael Nadal in the year.

The following are also career firsts for a single season for Murray: (1) won ≥$16,000,000 in prize money, (2) amassed 78 match wins, (3) reached 13 Tour finals, (4) won nine Tour titles, (5) won three Masters 1000 titles, (6) reached five Masters 1000 finals, (7) reached three Grand Slam finals, (8) won 24 consecutive matches, (9) won five consecutive tournament titles, (10) reached seven consecutive tournament finals, (11) won 16 matches against top-10 opponents. 

Murray ended the season by winning his last 24 matches, reaching the finals in 12 of his last 13 tournaments, and winning titles in his last five tournaments. In winning the 2016 ATP WTF, Murray defeated the No. 2 (Djokovic), No. 3 (Wawrinka), No. 4 (Raonic), No. 5 (Nishikori), and No. 7 (Cilic) in 5 consecutive matches.

Year summary

Australian Open and early hard court season

Prior to the Australian Open, Murray paired with Heather Watson to compete in the Hopman Cup. They were knocked out in the round robin stage after winning 2 out of 3 ties.

Australian Open 
Murray came through the opening two rounds of the Australian Open in straight sets against Alexander Zverev and Sam Groth for a combined loss of only 11 games. He followed this up with a four set win over João Sousa in the third round and a straight set win over Bernard Tomic in the fourth round to reach the quarterfinals.

In the quarterfinals Murray defeated David Ferrer in four sets. The match lasted over three hours, however Ferrer did not manage to hit a single ace.

Murray next played Milos Raonic in the semifinals. In another long affair, lasting over four hours, Murray came through in five sets to reach his fifth Australian Open Final.

In the final Murray played Novak Djokovic. It was their fourth meeting in an Australian Open final, with Djokovic having won the other three. Murray was not able to overcome the Serb and after losing the first five games ended up going down in three sets.

Davis Cup First round 
After taking February off to spend time with his new daughter, Sophia, Murray returned to action against Japan in the first round of the Davis Cup. He won his first singles rubber against Taro Daniel in straight sets before joining his brother Jamie to win the doubles against Yoshihito Nishioka and Yasutaka Uchiyama, also in straight sets. In his second singles rubber he defeated Kei Nishikori in five sets, having been two sets up at one point, thus securing the tie for Great Britain.

BNP Paribas Open, Indian Wells 
Murray began the first Masters series tournament of the year by beating Marcel Granollers in straight sets, but then lost to Federico Delbonis in the next round in three sets, despite holding a 4–1 lead in the third set.

Miami Masters 
Murray exited at the third round for the second tournament in a row, beating Denis Istomin in straight sets but losing to Grigor Dimitrov in the following match. Several commentators suggested that Murray was looking "exhausted", and that his form had appeared to drop since becoming a father for the first time.

European clay court season and Roland Garros

Monte-Carlo Masters 
In his first tournament on clay of the year, Murray beat Pierre-Hugues Herbert in his first match in three sets and recovered from a set and double-break down to beat Benoît Paire, reaching his first quarter-final since the Australian Open. There he beat Raonic for the second time in the year, losing just two games in the match, but lost to eventual champion Rafael Nadal in the semi-final.

Murray also competed in the doubles with partner Dominic Inglot, reaching the quarter finals before losing to Herbert and Nicolas Mahut.

Madrid Open 
Murray arrived in Madrid as the defending champion, and defeated Radek Štěpánek, Gilles Simon and Tomáš Berdych on the way to a second semi-final of the year against Nadal, this time winning in straight sets. In the final he lost to Novak Djokovic in three sets, a result that saw Murray fall to number three in the world rankings for the first time in 2016.

Italian Open 
Prior to the tournament, it was announced that Murray's coach, Amélie Mauresmo, would no longer be working with him. In the tournament itself, Murray recorded victories over Mikhail Kukushkin, Jérémy Chardy, David Goffin and Lucas Pouille, all in straight sets, to reach his first final in the Rome Masters. Once again he faced Djokovic, but this time won, again in straight sets, to win his first title of 2016 and 12th Masters title overall, as a result returning to the #2 ranking.

Roland Garros 
In his first round match, Murray was drawn against Radek Štěpánek and lost the first two sets, winning the third set before the match was suspended due to bad light. He recovered to win the match the following day in five sets. In the second round Murray again had to come from behind to win in five sets, this time against wild card Frenchman Mathias Bourgue. In the third and fourth rounds Murray won in straight sets against Ivo Karlović and John Isner respectively, before defeating Richard Gasquet in four sets to reach his fourth French Open semi-final. There he defeated defending champion Stanislas Wawrinka to reach his first final at the French Open and tenth overall, also becoming the tenth man in the Open Era to have reached all four Slam finals at least once. In the final he again played Novak Djokovic, their third tournament final in a row, winning the first set before eventually losing in four sets.

Grass Court Season 
As the grass court season began, Murray announced that he would again be working with former coach Ivan Lendl, after they had split in 2014.

Queen's Club Championships 
Murray defeated Nicolas Mahut in the first round, and then played his first tour-level matches against fellow Britons since losing to Tim Henman quickly made in 2006, defeating Aljaž Bedene and then Kyle Edmund in the quarter-finals in three sets. Murray reached the final after defeating Marin Čilić in the semi-finals, and won the title after coming from a set and a break down to defeat Milos Raonic for the third time in 2016. With this win Murray became the first person ever to win five titles at Queen's club.

Wimbledon Championships 
After straight-sets victories over Liam Broady, Lu Yen-hsun, John Millman and Nick Kyrgios, Murray reached his ninth consecutive quarter-final at Wimbledon. He then defeated Jo-Wilfried Tsonga in five sets, having been two sets up, to reach the semi-final for the seventh time, where he won in straight sets against Tomáš Berdych, reaching his third Slam final of 2016 and eleventh overall, more than any other British male player. For the first time in a Slam final, Murray's opponent was neither Djokovic nor Federer but Milos Raonic, who had beaten Federer in the semi finals, while Djokovic had lost earlier to Sam Querrey. Murray won the match in straight sets, winning his third Grand Slam title and second at Wimbledon.

Olympics and US Open 
Murray chose not to play in the quarter final of the Davis Cup World Group against Serbia, which the Great Britain team nevertheless won, and did not defend his title at the Canadian Open.

Rio Olympic Games 
Murray recorded victories over Viktor Troicki, Juan Mónaco, Fabio Fognini, Steve Johnson and Kei Nishikori to reach his sixth consecutive final in all tournaments played. In the final he defeated Juan Martín del Potro in four sets to secure his second Gold Medal in Olympics singles tennis, becoming the first male to win two singles Gold Medals and to successfully defend an Olympic singles title.

Cincinnati Masters 
At the Cincinnati Masters Murray continued his good form by beating Juan Mónaco, Kevin Anderson, and Bernard Tomic. He next faced Milos Raonic and won in straight sets to make it to the final for a third time, however lost to Marin Cilic. His loss to Cilic in the final was the first time since 2012 (l. Federer 2012 Wimbledon final) that someone other than Djokovic defeated him in a Tour final. Despite the loss, Murray recorded his best winning streak of his career, extending to 22 straight matches following his semifinal victory over Raonic.

US Open 
Murray entered the US Open as second seed, with the chance to reach all four Slam finals in a year. Victories over Lukas Rosol, Marcel Granollers, Paolo Lorenzi (in four sets) and Grigor Dimitrov saw him reach the quarter-finals, where he faced Kei Nishikori. Despite winning the first set easily, and then leading two sets to one, Nishikori eventually prevailed in five sets.

Davis Cup Semi-finals 
With Team GB victorious in the World Group quarter finals in the absence of Murray, he returned for the semi final against Argentina. In the first rubber, Murray and del Potro contested a five-set match, with del Potro eventually emerging as the winner. Murray teamed up with his brother Jamie to win the doubles, keeping Team GB in the tie, and then beat Guido Pella in three sets to take the tie to 2–2. Dan Evans would lose the deciding rubber, and Great Britain were unable to defend their Davis Cup title.

Asian Swing and End of Season

China Open 
Defending champion Novak Djokovic had withdrawn from the China Open, leaving Murray as the top seed. He went on to win the title for the first time, defeating Andreas Seppi, Andrey Kusnetsov, Kyle Edmund and David Ferrer on his way to the final, where he beat Grigor Dimitrov. Murray won each match in straight sets.

Shanghai Masters 
Murray continued his strong form in Shanghai, winning the tournament for the third time in his career and without dropping a set. After defeating Steve Johnson, Lucas Pouille, David Goffin and Gilles Simon, he faced Roberto Bautista Agut, who had reached his first Masters final after beating the defending champion Djokovic in the semi-final. After coming through a tight first set, Murray won the second set for the loss of a single game. These back-to-back tournament victories, combined with Djokovic's own dip in form, meant that Murray was within a thousand points of Djokovic in the ATP race rankings.

Vienna Open 
Murray brought his current win streak to 15 consecutive match wins by winning the Erste Bank Open for his 7th Tour title of the 2016 season. In his last 11 tournaments, Murray has reached the finals 10 times, including a career-best seven consecutive finals which ended with his quarter-final showing at the US Open. His tournament started slowly with 3-set wins over Martin Klizan and Gilles Simon in the first two rounds. However, a decisive win over John Isner in the quarter-finals and a walkover due to Ferrer's withdrawal with a leg injury saw Murray reach the final. There he defeated Jo-Wilfried Tsonga, for his third title in succession. The result saw Murray win seven titles in a single season for the first time in his career, and move to sole possession of 15th place on the all-time list of singles titles in the Open Era, breaking a tie with former world No. 1 Stefan Edberg. The win also took Murray over $10,000,000 prize money in a single season for the first time in his career.

Paris Masters 
With Djokovic's loss in the quarter-finals, Murray could become World No. 1 for the first time if he reached the final. In his first match Murray edged a tight three-set match against Fernando Verdasco, facing two break points in his last service game before winning eight straight points to take the match. Murray then beat Lucas Pouille for the third time in 2016 in straight sets for the loss of only three games, and reached the semi-final after beating Tomas Berdych in straight sets, despite facing five set points in a row in the first-set tie break. A walkover into the final, courtesy of Milos Raonic withdrawing, confirmed Murray as the new world No. 1. This was Murray's fifth consecutive Masters 1000 final (he skipped Canada); prior to this, his personal best was 2 consecutive Masters 1000 finals. He then won the Paris Masters for the first time in his career, beating John Isner 6–3 6–7(4) 6–4 for his 19th consecutive match win. His Paris crown means that Murray has now won 7 of the 9 different Masters 1000 events and is only missing Indian Wells and Monte Carlo.

World Tour Finals 

Murray was drawn in the same group as Marin Cilic, Kei Nishikori and Stan Wawrinka. He won all three of his group matches, including straight-sets wins over Cilic and Wawrinka, either side of a three-set match against Nishikori that set the record for longest match since the Tour Finals were hosted in London, at 3 hours 20 minutes. In the semi-final Murray defeated Milos Raonic for the sixth time in 2016, coming from a set down and breaking the record for longest match for the second time in a week at 3 hours 38 minutes.

In the final, Murray faced four-time defending champion Novak Djokovic. Murray won in straight sets. This saw Murray claim his first ATP World Tour Finals title, his ninth title of 2016, and ensured that he would hold the year-end No. 1 ranking for the first time.  In his very first tournament as the world No. 1, arguably the most impressive facet of the event was defeating the world No. 7 Cilic, No. 5 Nishikori, No. 3 Wawrinka, No. 4 Raonic, and No. 2 Djokovic in five successive matches. The last time a player defeated 5 of the top-7 players was when Roger Federer defeated No. 7 Ferrer, No. 5 Murray, No. 4 Soderling, No. 3 Djokovic, and No. 1 Nadal in the 2010 event. It also meant that Murray would finish the season with his 24th consecutive match win.

All matches

Singles

Doubles

Mixed doubles

Exhibitions

Tournament schedule

Singles schedule

Yearly records

Head-to-head matchups
(Bold denotes a top 10 player at the time of the most recent match between the two players, Italic denotes top 50.)

Finals

Singles: 13 (9–4)

Earnings

 Figures in United States dollars (USD) unless noted. 

 Bold denotes tournament win

See also
 2016 ATP World Tour
 2016 Roger Federer tennis season
 2016 Rafael Nadal tennis season
 2016 Novak Djokovic tennis season
 2016 Stan Wawrinka tennis season

Notes

References

External links
 
2016 Schedule at ATP World Tour

Andy Murray tennis seasons
2016 tennis player seasons
Medalists at the 2016 Summer Olympics
Tennis players at the 2016 Summer Olympics
2016 in British sport